County Carlow was a constituency representing County Carlow in the Irish House of Commons, the lower house in the Irish Parliament of the Kingdom of Ireland.

History
In the Patriot Parliament of 1689 summoned by King James II, Carlow County was represented with two members. When the Acts of Union 1800 merged the Irish Parliament into the United Kingdom Parliament with effect from 1 January 1801, Carlow County sent to two MPs to the United Kingdom House of Commons.

Members of Parliament
 1375: Godfrey de Valle and Philip de Valle
 1559: William FitzWilliam and Sir Edmund Butler
 1585: Sir Henry Wallop and Geoffrey Fenton
 1613–1615: Sir Morgan Cavanagh and George Bagenal of Dunleckny
 1634–1635: Sir Thomas Butler, Bt and James Butler of Tinnehinch
 1639–1649: Sir Thomas Butler, Bt (died 1642) and Oliver Eustace
 1659: Sir Thomas Harman
 1661–1666: Sir John Temple and  Sir William Temple

1689–1801

Notes

References

Bibliography

Constituencies of the Parliament of Ireland (pre-1801)
Historic constituencies in County Carlow
1800 disestablishments in Ireland
Constituencies disestablished in 1800